Youser or Shaanxi Non-ferrous Metals Holding Group is the biggest molybdenum and titanium mining and metallurgy company in Shaanxi, China. Via subsidiaries, the company develops, manages, and operates non-ferrous metal resources, including  lead, zinc, molybdenum, aluminum and titanium products, among others. The Group is also active in geological engineering and the processing and trading of mining products.

History
The company was established in 2000 from a state-owned enterprise in Shaanxi province, China. The company is competing with Western Mining Co. Ltd. for an 80 percent investment in the Hui Dong Lead and Zinc Mine, which has an annual production capacity of 450,000 tons.

In 2012, the Shaanxi provincial government formed a non-profit joint venture with Shaanxi Youser to finance the relocation and housing for individuals affected by a major resettlement project. The company provided two-thirds of the venture's $475m, while the rest was financed by the government. However, Youser Group contributed another $475m of borrowed money later on.

In 2016, it was announced that the Group's Indonesian subsidiary would construct an alumina refinery in Indonesia's East Kotawaringin district, Central Kalimantan, in collaboration with a Chinese investor, in order to exploit the high-quality bauxite of the area.

References

External links
Youser official site 

Mining companies of China
Metal companies of China
Companies based in Shaanxi
Companies established in 2000
Titanium mining
Molybdenum mining
2000 establishments in China